Manuel "Manu" Alejandro García Sánchez (born 26 April 1986) is a Spanish professional footballer who plays for CD Mirandés. Mainly a central midfielder, he can also play as a winger or a left back.

He spent the better part of his career with Alavés after signing in 2012, appearing in 308 competitive matches and winning the 2015–16 Segunda División. In La Liga, he totalled 144 games and eight goals over five seasons with the club.

Club career

Early career
Born in Vitoria-Gasteiz, Álava, García finished his development at Real Sociedad, and made his senior debut with the reserves in the 2005–06 season, in Segunda División B. In July 2008 he signed for Segunda División club SD Eibar, but was immediately loaned to Real Unión in the third tier.

García featured regularly during his loan spell, scoring eight goals to help his team return to division two after 44 years. In July 2009 he rejoined the Armeros, who in turn had suffered relegation. Despite being an undisputed starter during the campaign, he was deemed surplus to requirements in July 2010.

On 30 December 2010, García joined fellow third-division side UD Logroñés. In 2011–12 he netted a career-best seven goals, as they finished two points short of the play-offs.

Alavés
In June 2012, García moved to Deportivo Alavés, the club he supported as a child. He was an ever-present figure in his first year, appearing in 37 league matches to help his team achieve promotion to the second division in the playoffs.

García appeared in his first game as a professional on 24 August 2013, a 1–1 home draw against UD Las Palmas. He scored his first professional goal on 15 September 2013, in a 2–1 away loss to Real Murcia. On 2 July 2014, he signed a new two-year contract with the Basques.

García contributed 37 appearances and five goals in 2015–16, and Alavés returned to La Liga after ten years. He made his debut in the league on 21 August, starting and scoring a last-minute equaliser in a 1–1 draw at Atlético Madrid.

On 6 October 2018, after having come on as a 74th-minute substitute for Mubarak Wakaso, García netted 21 minutes later from a corner kick to help his team get their first win against Real Madrid in 88 years. On 26 May 2021, after nine years at the Mendizorrotza Stadium, the 35-year-old left the club.

Aris Limassol / Mirandés
On 9 August 2021, García signed for Aris Limassol FC in the Cypriot First Division. Roughly one year later, he returned to his home country after signing a one-year contract with CD Mirandés in the second division.

Career statistics

Club

Honours
Alavés
Segunda División: 2015–16
Copa del Rey runner-up: 2016–17

References

External links

1986 births
Living people
Footballers from Vitoria-Gasteiz
Spanish footballers
Association football defenders
Association football midfielders
Association football wingers
Association football utility players
La Liga players
Segunda División players
Segunda División B players
Real Sociedad B footballers
Real Unión footballers
SD Eibar footballers
UD Logroñés players
Deportivo Alavés players
CD Mirandés footballers
Cypriot First Division players
Aris Limassol FC players
Spain youth international footballers
Basque Country international footballers
Spanish expatriate footballers
Expatriate footballers in Cyprus
Spanish expatriate sportspeople in Cyprus